Puka Puka may refer to:

 Puka Puka (Chumbivilcas), a mountain in the Chumbivilcas Province, Cusco Region, Peru
 Puka Puka (Cochabamba), a mountain in the Cochabamba Department, Bolivia
 Puka Puka (La Paz), a mountain in the La Paz Department, Bolivia
 Puka Puka (Lima), a mountain in the Lima Region, Peru
 Pukapuka, a coral atoll in the northern Cook Islands in Polynesia
 Puka-Puka, a small coral atoll on the north side of the Tuamotus in French Polynesia

See also
Puka (disambiguation)